Montpelier is a small unincorporated community in Stanislaus County, California, United States, and is about  south of Waterford. It was established in 1891 on the railroad tracks.

Populated places established in 1891
Unincorporated communities in California
Unincorporated communities in Stanislaus County, California
1891 establishments in California